Fauler Zauber Dunkelherz is a tour EP by German metalcore band Callejon.

Track listing

External links 
 Fauler Zauber Dunkelherz at Callejon's official website

2007 albums
Callejon (band) albums